Trichoeax somaliensis is a species of beetle in the family Cerambycidae, and the only species in the genus Trichoeax. It was described by Breuning in 1938.

References

Ancylonotini
Beetles described in 1938
Monotypic beetle genera